Sing Lustily And With Good Courage is an album by Maddy Prior and the Carnival Band. It was recorded at Valley Recordings in March 1990 and released as a CD on the Saydisc label.

 This is a collection of "Gallery Songs" from the 18th and early 19th centuries. Gallery songs were popular hymns which were purged from hymnals in the late nineteenth centuries. As they generally have strong words and tunes, many are worth reviving. The best known precedent for recording such an album is The Watersons' "Sound, Sound Your Instruments of Joy" (1977).

Track listing 
Who would true valour see  (John Bunyan - music; trad)
Rejoice ye shining worlds  (Isaac Watts - music from Harmonia Sacra)
O Thou who camest from above  (Charles Wesley - music; Samuel Stanley)
Lo! He comes with clouds descending  (Charles Wesley - music; anon)
How firm a foundation   (Richard Keen - music; trad)
O for a thousand tongues to sing   (Charles Wesley - music; Thomas Jarman)
As pants the hart    (Nahum Tate - music; Hugh Wilson)
The God of Abraham Praise   (Thomas Oliver - music; anon)
Instrumentals: The Twenty-Ninth of May or The Jovial Beggars / Monkland (anon)
Light of the World   (Charles Wesley - music; anon)
All hail the pow'r of Jesus' name   (Edward Perronet & John Rippon - music; James Ellor)
Lord, in the morning   (Isaac Watts - music; anon)
Away with our sorrow and care  (Charles Wesley - music; Thomas Arne)
Christ the Lord is ris'n today   (Charles Wesley - music; anon
O Worship the King    (Robert Grant - music; William Croft)
And can it be?    (Charles Wesley - music; Thomas Campbell)

Personnel 
  Maddy Prior - Singer
  Bill Badley  - Lute, guitar, steel-string guitar, Mandolin, mandocello, banjo, vocals
  Charles Fullbrook  - Tabors, Side drum, Bass drum, cymbals, wood blocks, cowbell, vocals
  Andrew "Jub" Davis - Double bass
  Giles Lewin  - Violin, recorder, vocals
  Andy Watts  - Curtal, Basson, clarinet, recorder, vocals
 Gary Wilson - drums, Percussion

Maddy Prior albums
1990 albums